Gerard Granollers and Pedro Martínez were the defending champions and successfully defended their title.

Granollers and Martínez won the title after defeating Kimmer Coppejans and Sergio Martos Gornés 7–5, 6–4 in the final.

Seeds

Draw

References

External links
 Main draw

Copa Sevilla - Doubles
2019 Doubles